Cologno Monzese is a comune (municipality) in the Metropolitan City of Milan in the Italian region of Lombardy, located about  northeast of Milan. 
The population increased substantially after World War II, when many  people from Southern Italy settled here (especially from Apulia).

After being subject for a long time to the influence exerted by San Maurizio al Lambro (which is now part of the municipality as a hamlet) Cologno received the honorary title of city with a presidential decree on September 19, 1996.

Main sights

Sights in Cologno include Villa Casati, the seat of the comune, and San Giuliano, a medieval Romanesque church. Part of the commune is included in the Media Valle del Lambro Park.

The TV studios of Mediaset and some radio networks (RTL 102.5, Radio Italia and Radio TRS) are located here.

Transport

The town is served by three stations of the Milan Metro: Cologno Nord (North), Cologno Centro (Centre) and Cologno Sud (South).
The nearest airport is Linate, in Milan, but Malpensa is not far. Cologno is also linked up with Milan by the Tangenziale Est, an orbital motorway that surrounds the capital city of Lombardy.

People
 J-Ax (1972), rapper
 Grido (1979), rapper

References

External links
 Official website

 
Cities and towns in Lombardy